Rutten may refer to:

Places
Rutten, Belgium, a village in Belgium, noted as the location of the Hamal Castle
Rutten, Netherlands, a town in Noordoostpolder, Flevoland, Netherlands

People with the surname
Bas Rutten (born 1965), Dutch mixed martial artist and kickboxer
Ben Rutten (born 1983), Australian rules footballer 
Fred Rutten (born 1962), Dutch football player and coach
 (1902–1982), Dutch movie director
Gwendolyn Rutten (born 1975), Belgian politician
Louis Rutten (1884–1946), Dutch geologist
Marguerite Rutten (1898-1984), French archaeologist and Assyriologist
Martin Rutten (1876–1944), Belgian civil servant
Martin Gerard Rutten (1910–1970), Dutch geologist and biologist, son of Louis
Martin-Hubert Rutten (1841–1927), Belgian bishop
Peter Johannes Rutten (1864–1953), Dutch politician
 (born 1963), Belgian actor
Theo Rutten (1899–1980), Dutch politician

See also
Rutte (disambiguation)

Dutch-language surnames
Patronymic surnames